Theni District is one of the 38 districts of Tamil Nadu state in India. Well protected by the scenic hill locks, the district is located besides Madurai district. The town of Theni is the district headquarters. The district is divided into two natural divisions: The hilly areas are constituted by parts of the five taluk's Theni, Bodinayakanur, Periyakulam, Uthamapalayam and Andipatti with thick vegetation and perennial streams from the hills on the western side and Cumbum valley which lies in Uthamapalayam taluk. As of 2011, Theni district had a population of 1,245,899 with a sex ratio of 980 females for every 1,000 males.

History
Theni District was formed by the bifurcation from the former Madurai District as per G.O. Ms. No. 679 Revenue Department dated 7 July 1996. Consequent to the bifurcation, one new Revenue Division with headquarters at Uthamapalayam and two new Taluks at Theni and Bodinayakanur were also created with effect from 1 January 1997. Theni Municipal town was only a firka headquarters until 31 December 1996. Consequent to the formation of the new District, Theni Municipal Town was upgraded as the Taluk and District headquarters on 1 January 1997.

The region covered by present-day Theni District was sparsely populated before the 1900s. In 1886 Mullaperiyar dam project bought some part of the water from Periyar River downhill to the Cumbum Valley and merged it into the Mullayar River. This project helped more people to settle down in Cumbum Valley. Also to be noted that Theni was itself was a small though lesser-known town by the 1900s. After the Mullai-Periyar merger project, many people from nearby arid regions (Sivakasi, Kovilpatti, Virudhunagar, Sattur and several nearby towns) settled in Cumbum Valley (present day Theni District). So there was influx of people by the 1890s to 1920s. Bodi and Periyakulam were famous places at that time. Later Theni developed rapidly due to commerce.

Geography

The  district lies at the foot of the Western Ghats between 9' 39' and 10' 30' North latitude and between 77' 00' and 78' 30' of East Longitude. Central location: . The district is bounded by Dindigul District to the north, Madurai District to the east, Virudhunagar District to the southwest, and Idukki district of the Kerala State to the west. The district is home to Theni, Periyakulam, Bodinayakanur, Cumbum, Uthamapalayam, Kombai, Gudalur, Gandamanur, Chinnamanur, Kuchanur, Andipatti, Rasingapuram, Thevaram, Pottipuram, Ramakrishnapuram, B. Ammapatti, Lakshmipuram, Ambasamudram, Govindanagaram, Mayladumparai,Srirengapuram, Venkadachalapuram, K.Pudupatti, Devadhanapatti, Varusanadu, Odaipatti, Erasakkanayackanur and several other small villages like Gohilapuram, Pathirakalipuram, Sukkangalpatti, Kamarajapuram, Sadaiyalpatti, Meenatchipuram, Melasindalaichery, Hanumanthanpatty, Pallavarayan Patti and Kamatchipuram.

It is diversified by several ranges and hills. Many villages likes Sangakonampatti are depends only on agricultural incomes. A range of hills which runs parallel to Western Ghats from north to south separate it from the neighboring state of Kerala.

Climate
The district is known for its salubrious climate, hills and lakes.

Rivers and dams
The  Vaigai River, Kottagudi River, Varaganathi River, Shanmuganathi River and Manjalar River  flow through the district. The important reservoirs in the district are Lower Periyar Dam, Vaigai Dam, Shanmuganathi Dam and  Sothuparai Dam.

Politics  

|}

Economy

The economy of Theni district is mostly agricultural. Utilisation of land area for cultivation in the district is 40.33%. The principal crop production (in tonnes) in 2005-2006 were sugarcane 1,201,221, cotton 95,360 (561 bales of 170. kg lint each), rice (paddy) 66,093, millets and other cereals 57,081, pulses 6,677, groundnut 4,021 and gingelly 325.
Silk, Banana, Coconut, Tea, Coffee, Cardamom, Grapes and Mangoes are other main produce of the district.
even though this place is economically good. Kolukkumalai located in Theni district atop the Western ghats is the home to the highest tea plantation in the world.
Cumbum Valley is a major centre for grape production with 4,000 small farmers producing over 90,000 tonnes of Muscat grapes, locally known as panneer dhrakshai, and about 10,000 tonnes of Thomson seedless grapes. The unique feature here is that the grapes are harvested throughout the year, while in most grape growing centres elsewhere the season ends with summer.

Cotton Spinning Mills and Sugar Mills are the major industries in this district. In Andipatti Taluk Handloom weaving and power looms are flourishing. In Uthamapalayam Taluk, the Highwavis Estate produces an important amount of Tea. Bodinayakanur is a major market place (Auction Centres) for cardamom, coffee, tea and black pepper. This city is also called "Cardamom City" because of the large quantity of cardamom trade in this area. It has an auction centre for cardamom.

The Periyar and Surliar Hydro Power Stations and the Vaigai Micro Hydro Power Station have 181 MW installed capacity and actual power generation of 494 MW in 1996 in this district. Theni is one of the active business hubs in the western side of Tamil Nadu, inviting more industries to its locality.  The district currently has 41.09 km of Metre gauge track serving 3 Railway Stations which connect to Madurai. The Teni Junction Railway Station is the most important railway station in the district.

Forest resources 

The forest area in Theni district is about 33.70%. There is no unclassed forest type in the district. About  of artificial forest area are cultivated in the district. Wattle, softwood, fuel wood, cashew, neem, and tamarind are the main forest plantation species in the district. The Meghamalai Wildlife sanctuary, Srivilliputhur elephant reserve, and part of Kodaikanal Wildlife Sanctuary are situated in Theni district.

There has been no conservation of biological resources in the district. The information of wild life census in Theni district is yet to be made available.

Demographics

According to 2011 census, Theni district had a population of 1,245,899 with a sex-ratio of 991 females for every 1,000 males, much above the national average of 929. 53.81% of the population lived in urban areas. A total of 119,661 were under the age of six, constituting 61,873 males and 57,788 females. Scheduled Castes and Scheduled Tribes accounted for 20.72% and 0.15% of the population respectively. The average literacy of the district was 69.84%, compared to the national average of 72.99%. The district had a total of 338,112 households. There were a total of 591,642 workers, comprising 36,371 cultivators, 275,585 main agricultural labourers, 12,714 in house hold industries, 205,921 other workers, 61,051 marginal workers, 1,996 marginal cultivators, 39,576 marginal agricultural labourers, 2,225 marginal workers in household industries and 17,254 other marginal workers.

At the time of the 2011 census, 79.04% of the population spoke Tamil, 12.75% Telugu and 7.86% Kannada as their first language.

Places of interest
Periyakulam, Theni, Uthamapalayam, Cumbum, and Bodinayakanur are charming towns in the district. Cascades, silver-lined clouds resting atop green hill tops, sheer rock faces and temples of antiquity distinguish these places.

Festivals

The Karuppaswamy festival celebration at Anaipatti.
Arilmigu Krishnan Kovil Thiruvizha in Purattasi thingal at Lakshmipuram (Jangal Patti Panchayat).
B.Ammapatti, Kaliamman kovil is the famous god to solve problems and has a great festival on 1 April.
The Ramzan Peru naal Thozhuhai at Periyakulam, Uthamapalayam, Cumbum, Devadhanapatti, Gudalur, Kottur, Bodinayakanur, Chinnamanur, Batalagundu in Theni.
The celebration of Gowmariyamman temple festival at Veerapandi and Cumbum during the month of May.
Shri Bathirakaliyamman Chiththirai Thiruvizha Festival at Bathirakalipuram and visuvasapuram near Bodi.
Shri Veerappa Ayyanar Festival during Chiththirai Thiruvizha at Theni-Allinagaram.
Kamatchi Amman festival at Devadhanapatti and Suyambu Saneeswara Bagavan and the month of Aadi every friday celebration on Temple festival at Kuchanoor.
Apart from Pongal celebrations in other areas, the birthday of John Pennycuick who built the MullaiPeriyar Dam  is celebrated in Surulipatty and other places.
Theni district is known for its celebration of Pongal, which is considered to be one of the most important festivals of Tamil Nadu. Pallavarayanpatti, Ayyampatti and Pudupatti is known for its Jallikattu during the Pongal festival.
Another important festival is Chitra Pournima festival, which is celebrated at Sri Mangala Devi Kannagi temple, on the Western Ghats near Gudalur during the month of May. 
Other important festivals of the region are festivals of Masi Maham and Shivarathri which are celebrated in the Kamatchi Amman Temple during the months of February–March and kottur Ekadasi.
Christmas and New Year are celebrated in Anaimalayanpatty.
Chithirai Thiruvizha in which Lord Aalagar enters in the Vaigai river at Ambasamudram & Govinda Nagaram.
Pankuni Thiruvizha in Gandamanur.
Arulmigu Pattalamman, Kaliyamman, Karuppasamy temple festival in Kattunaickenpatty
Uppukottai Varatharaja Perumal Kovil.
Our Lady of Snow's Church festival celebration at Royappanpatti in the month of August.
Holy spirit church in Hanumanthanpatti, they celebrate St. Xavier festival on 2 December every year.
Manthaiyamman temple festival is celebrated in Gudalur(Melagudalur) of Theni district.
Srinivasaka Perumal Kovil temple festival is celebrated in Silamalai(Bodi Taluk) of Theni district.
Thai Poosam Festival at Shanmuganathar Temple at Kamayagoundanpatti. Siddar Sri Guru Boga Eswara Ananda Swami had visited this Temple during Thai Poosam Festival.

Forestry
Theni is the orchid of Tamil Nadu. It has numerous green lands like the Western Ghats stretching from Kodaikanal to Kumily via Periyakulam. Theni District has the Western Ghats as its Western Boundary.  Theni District has many tourist spots like Kumbakarai Falls, Sothuparai Dam, Vaigai Dam, Manjalaaru Dam, Kurathi Falls, which are originating from the Western Gahats. Theni District is having the other tourist attractive places like Veerapandi Gowmariyamman temple, Surulipatti kailasanaathar temple, Anumanthampatti Hanuman kovil, Periyakulam Balasubramanian Periya kovil.

Tamil Movies based on Theni District 
Some of the Famous Cinema Directors, Music Directors and Actors hail from Theni District. Many movies were shot here. The titles of some of the famous Movies are: "Pithamagan", "Avan-ivan", "Suntharapandiyan", "Veeralaksumi", "Varuthapadatha Vaalipar Sangam", "Naan kadavul". These Movies were mostly directed by Director Bala.

Notable people
For people from Theni town itself, see Theni, these are people from the surrounding area
 
 
 Gangai Amaran - music composer, singer, lyricist, writer, film director and actor, born in Pannaipuram
 Bala - director, screenwriter, producer
 Bharathiraja - movie director, screenwriter, producer, actor
 Dhanush - film actor, director, screenwriter, lyricist, singer
 N. Eramakrishnan MLA, Cumbum
 Tarun Gopi - actor, film director, script writer
 Ilaiyaraaja - music director, singer, songwriter, instrumentalist, orchestrator, conductor-arranger and lyricist
 Raj Kapoor - director, actor
 Raveendranath Kumar - Member of parliament
 Theni Kunjarammal - actor, singer, folk performer / singer
 R. Muthuraman - actor
 O. Panneerselvam - former Chief Minister, Deputy CM and Finance Minister of Tamil Nadu State
 Singam Puli - actor, comedian, film director, script writer
 P. T. Rajan - former CM of Madras state
 Rajashekar - actor
 Selvaraghavan - film director, lyricist, screenwriter 
 Sendrayan - actor
 Vairamuthu - Tamil poet, lyricist, author
 R.V. Shajeevana - New District Collector for Theni District

See also
Kombai, Tamil Nadu
List of districts of Tamil Nadu

References

External links

 Theni District

 
Districts of Tamil Nadu
1996 establishments in Tamil Nadu